Aenigmatias is a genus of flies in the family Phoridae.

Species
A. brevifrons Schmitz, 1955
A. coloradensis (Brues, 1914)
A. curvinervis Borgmeier, 1962
A. dorni (Enderlein, 1908)
A. eurynotus (Brues, 1914)
A. exreginae Jancík & Disney, 2020
A. franzi Schmitz, 1950
A. fuscipennis Borgmeier, 1963
A. gotoi Disney, 2002
A. highlandicus Schmitz, 1914
† A. kishenehnensis Brown, 2019
A. lubbocki (Verrall, 1877)
A. nigricornis Borgmeier, 1963
A. picipes Schmitz, 1927
A. pyrenaicus (Becker, 1912)
A. schwarzii Coquillett, 1903

References

Phoridae
Platypezoidea genera
Kishenehn Formation
Taxa named by Frederik Vilhelm August Meinert